Omer Vercouteren (born 28 November 1929) is a Belgian wrestler. He competed in the men's Greco-Roman bantamweight at the 1956 Summer Olympics.

References

External links
 

1929 births
Possibly living people
Belgian male sport wrestlers
Olympic wrestlers of Belgium
Wrestlers at the 1956 Summer Olympics
Sportspeople from Antwerp Province